The 2008–09 season was the 63rd season in Rijeka's history. It was their 18th season in the Prva HNL and 35th successive top tier season.

Competitions

Prva HNL

Classification

Results summary

Results by round

Matches

Prva HNL

Source: HRnogomet.com

Croatian Cup

Source: HRnogomet.com

Intertoto Cup

Source: HRnogomet.com

Squad statistics
Competitive matches only.  Appearances in brackets indicate numbers of times the player came on as a substitute.

See also
2008–09 Prva HNL
2008–09 Croatian Cup
2008 UEFA Intertoto Cup

References

External sources
 2008–09 Prva HNL at HRnogomet.com
 2008–09 Croatian Cup at HRnogomet.com 
 Prvenstvo 2008.-2009. at nk-rijeka.hr

HNK Rijeka seasons
Rijeka